

This is a list of the National Register of Historic Places listings in Jersey County, Illinois.

This is intended to be a complete list of the properties and districts on the National Register of Historic Places in Jersey County, Illinois, United States. Latitude and longitude coordinates are provided for many National Register properties and districts; these locations may be seen together in a map.

There are 21 properties and districts listed on the National Register in the county.

Current listings

|}

See also

List of National Historic Landmarks in Illinois
National Register of Historic Places listings in Illinois

References

Jersey